Werner Veigel (9 November 1928 – 2 May 1995) was a Dutch-born German journalist and news presenter.

Veigel was born in The Hague, the son of a German salesman. After his education he successfully completed a sales trainee ship in a travel agency. When Radio Hilversum sought an announcer in 1950 Veigel applied and was given the position.  In February 1954 he moved to the NWDR, where he was employed as a presenter and newsreader. From 1961 onward he also worked as an announcer and host on television.

In 1966 Veigel became a narrator on the Tagesschau, the oldest and the most watched news bulletin on German television. In 1987 Tagesschau promoted him to the role of chief newsreader, succeeding Karl-Heinz Köpcke. He was considered exemplary in terms of his faultlessness in emphasis, presentation and articulation.

He commentated on the 1978 Eurovision Song Contest for ARD, and in 1980 played himself in the Udo Lindenberg film Panic Time. In 1985 Veigel spoke the samples for a German version of Paul Hardcastle's single  19 which reached Number 1 in Germany.

In January 1995 Veigel had to give up his position on the Tagesschau due to his declining health. In a magazine interview  given the following month he came out as gay; he had lived with his partner Carlheinz Faust since 1955.

Veigel died on 2 May 1995 as a result of a brain tumour.  He is buried in Ohlsdorf Cemetery in Hamburg.

Literature
 Dagmar Berghoff, Wilhelm Wieben, Werner Veigel: Rezepte und Geschichten aus 2000 Plattenkisten. Kuhle L. Verlag, 1987

References

External links
 

German broadcast news analysts
German television talk show hosts
German reporters and correspondents
German male journalists
20th-century German journalists
1928 births
1995 deaths
German LGBT journalists
German LGBT broadcasters
Deaths from brain tumor
Deaths from cancer in Germany
German gay writers
Journalists from The Hague
ARD (broadcaster) people
Tagesschau (ARD) presenters and reporters
Norddeutscher Rundfunk people
20th-century LGBT people